Pedro Estala (1757–1815) was a Spanish hellenist, philologist, writer, translator, literary critic, and literary editor.

Biography
His family was originally from Valencia, his mother was born in Alicante and married Hipólito Casiano Antonio Estala on 10 February 1754. The paternal grandfather, Joseph Estala Valero, was also Valencia and married La Mancha Maria Josefa Lozano Ruiz de Valdelomar, who was born in Daimiel and was of noble origin; hence Estala often replaced his second surname to Valdelomar. The couple had nine children, of which Pedro third.

Estala was probably educated in a school of Escolapios of Madrid. In 1778 he entered as a professor at the College of San Fernando neighborhood of Lavapiés, where he taught humanities until 1788, when he was appointed professor of rhetoric and Greek in the Council Seminary of San Carlos in Salamanca, during the golden age of Order the Pious Schools, recently restored by Felipe Scio de San Miguel so that the study of classical languages be promoted to replace the expelled Jesuit order in this field. Contrary to the assertions of Marcelino Menéndez Pelayo, claiming there is no evidence that Estala studied philosophy and theology at Salamanca. But often he traveled to Salamanca since 1776, as linked to the bishop of Salamanca since 1763 and since 1774 Inquisitor General Felipe Bertrán. It was this important protector Estala who created the Seminary of San Carlos de Salamanca where Estala became a professor of rhetoric and Greek in 1788 and was Valencian, as the paternal family Estala.

Work
 Solemn funeral held in the holy church of Salamanca and Real Seminario de San Carlos in the translation of the body of Sir Don Felipe Bertran, Bishop of Salamanca, Inquisitor General, bishop knight Grand Crus of the Royal and Distinguished Spanish Order of Carlos III, 1790.
 Journey to Parnassus, published by Maria Elena Cruz Arenas Journal of the Enlightenment and Romanticism, No. 10 (2002).
 The universal traveler or news of old and new world, collected works of the best travelers, translated into Castilian and corrected the original and illustrated with notes by Don Pedro Estala, Madrid, 1795-1801, 43 vols.
 "Discourse on the tragedy" in his translation of Sophocles, Oedipus Tyrannus, 1793.
 "Discourse on the comedy" in his translation of Aristophanes, The Pluto, 1794.
 Preface to Poems by Francisco de Figueroa, called the Divine, 1785.
 Preface to Rimas doctor Bartholomew Leonardo de Argensola, 1786.
 Preface to Rhymes Fernando de Herrera, 1786.
 Preface to Rimas Don Juan de Jauregui, 1786.
 Preface to Rimas Lupercio secretary Leonardo de Argensola, 1786.
 Preface to Poems of Don Luis de Gongora y Argote, 1789.
 Preface to Lope de Vega, Human and divine the lawyer took Burguillos Rhymes, 1792.
 "Prologue" to works Christobal de Castillejo, secretary of Emperor Ferdinand, 1792.
 "Shadow Celenio Inarco Nelson, PA, translated fool to those who know another language this" in Minerva or the Auditor General No.. XXV, December 24, 1805, pp. 217–220.
 El Imparcial or Political Gazette - Literary, Madrid, from March to August 1809.
 Moral tales of Marmontel, translated by Don Pedro Estala, Valencia, Salva, 1813.
 Bello-critical satirical registration for intelligence like the Spanish spelling, Madrid, 1785 (signed with the pseudonym of Claudio Bachelor Rosillo)
 The five books on the opinions of philosophers, Plutarch translated from Greek and illustrated, Madrid, 1793, handwritten translation.
 Letters from a Spanish to  Anglomaniac, Madrid, 1795, reprinted in London 1804, Cadiz and Madrid 1805, 1815; no later reprints.
 Compendium of Natural History of Buffon, translated and illustrated by Don Pedro Estala, priest, Imp. de Villalpando, 1802-1811
 "Letters to Forner" published in the Bulletin of the Academy of History, vol. LVIII, 1814.

References
 Arenas Maria Elena Cruz, Pedro Estala life and work, a contribution to literary theory of the eighteenth century Spanish, Madrid: National Research Council, 2003.
 Arenas Maria Elena Cruz, "Pedro Estala as monthly censor in the Diario de Madrid (1795-1798) ", in Magazine of Literature LXII, No. 24 (July–December 2000), pp. 327–346.
 Arenas Maria Elena Cruz, "A Journey to Parnassus Peter Estala" in Eighteen. Hispanic Enlightenment, 26.1 (Sprint, 2003), pp. 131–157.
 Arenas Maria Elena Cruz, "In Estala relief. By the way a criticism of The Philosopher love Forner in the Diario de Madrid (1795)," in Journal of Studies of the eighteenth century, nos. 10-11 (2000-2001), pp. 17–41.
 Arenas Maria Elena Cruz, "The Letters of Pedro Juan Pablo Forner Estala (new critical edition)", in Journal of Studies of the eighteenth century, no. 19 (2009), pp. 89–142.

Spanish male writers
Spanish literary critics
Afrancesados
People from the Province of Ciudad Real
1757 births
1815 deaths
18th-century Spanish journalists
19th-century Spanish journalists